The Tapling Collection of postage stamps was donated to the British Museum from the estate of Thomas Tapling in 1891.

The probate value of the Tapling collection was set at £12,000 but on arrival Richard Garnett (assistant keeper of Printed Books) estimated their value at more than £50,000 and described the bequest as the most valuable gift since the Grenville Library in 1847 (equivalent to £24,000,000 in 2011).

It is held in the Philatelic Collections of the British Library and selected items are on permanent public exhibition.

The collection covers the period 1840 to 1890 with some items up to 1900 added subsequently and recorded on the album pages. As of January 2009 the stamps were held in 72 boxes and the postal stationery part held in 113 albums and seven boxes.

Highlights

The collection features these rarities:
 Gold Coast: 1883 (May) 1d on 4d magenta, unique
 Great Britain: 1858-79 1d red, plate 77, one of a few known
 Hawaii: 1851-52 2 cents to 13 cents (both types), the "Missionaries"
 India: 1854 4 annas blue and pale red, error head inverted, two used on a cover, unique
 Mauritius: 1847 1d red used on cover and 2d blue, the "Post Office" issue
 Spain: 1851 2 reales, error of colour, one of three known
 Switzerland: Zurich: 1843 4 rappen, the unique unsevered horizontal strip of five
 Uruguay: 1858 120 centavos blue and 180 centavos green, in tête beche pairs, two of five known
 Western Australia: 1854-55 4d blue, error frame inverted

The collection also includes a significant number of colour varieties of early United States postal issues.

See also
 British Library Philatelic Collections
 List of postage stamps

References and sources
References

Sources

External links
 

British Library Philatelic Collections